The Liaoshen campaign Liáoshěn huìzhàn, an abbreviation of Liaoning–Shenyang campaign after the province of Liaoning and its Yuan directly administered capital city Shenyang, was the first of the three major military campaigns (along with Huaihai campaign and Pingjin campaign) launched by the Communist People's Liberation Army (PLA) against the Kuomintang Nationalist government during the late stage of the Chinese Civil War. This engagement is also known to the Kuomintang as the Liaohsi campaign Liáoxī huìzhàn, and took place between September and November 1948, lasting a total of 52 days. The campaign ended after the Nationalist forces suffered sweeping defeats across Manchuria, losing the major cities of Jinzhou, Changchun, and eventually Shenyang in the process, leading to the capture of the whole of Manchuria by the Communist forces. The victory of the campaign resulted in the Communists achieving a strategic numerical advantage over the Nationalists for the first time in its history.

Background

Race for Manchuria 
Manchuria, alternatively known as the Northeast China in contemporary accounts, was the most industrialized region in China.  In the immediate aftermath of the Second Sino-Japanese War, Manchuria was placed under Soviet occupation.  Both the Nationalists and the Communists began their expansion in the region after the Soviet withdrawal in March 1946.  After the Communist Winter Offensive of 1947 in Northeast China, the PLA had expanded considerably in the Northeast, surpassing the Nationalists in total operational strength in Northeast China for the first time since the beginning of the civil war.  In response to the deteriorating situation for the Nationalists, Chiang Kai-shek decided to replace Chen Cheng with Wei Lihuang as the commander of the Nationalist forces in the Northeast.

Prelude 

In January 1948, the Communist forces in the Northeast were renamed as the Northeast Field Army with Lin Biao as the commander. The Nationalist forces were indecisive in responding to Communist expansion, as Wei Lihuang directly clashed with Chiang over Nationalist strategies in the Northeast. Wei believed that it was better to "preserve the status quo" and concentrate on defending Shenyang and Changchun, while Chiang insists Wei to withdraw from these two cities and concentrate Nationalist forces in the Jinzhou-Huludao area to prevent the PLA from entering the North China Plain through the Shanhai Pass.

By spring 1948, the Communist forces were in control of the countryside across Northeast China, isolating the Nationalist forces in Shenyang, Changchun and Jinzhou from each other. In addition, the PLA had seized control of the Jingha Railway, cutting off the Nationalist land route supply lines to Shenyang and Changchun. Consequently, supplies for the Nationalist forces in the Northeast had to be airlifted, which were largely ineffective and unsustainable.

Communist advance (12 September – 20 October)

Jinzhou 

Jinzhou was a "key point" in the Liaoxi Corridor, the principal land passage from Manchuria to North China Plain.  On 12 September 1948, the Northeast Field Army headed south and launched a series of attacks along the Beining Railway.  Between 12 September to 28 September, the Communist forces maneuvered to cut off Nationalist supply line from Qinhuangdao to Jinzhou.  By 28 September, they had captured Suizhong, Changli, Tashan and Yixian, controlling the area between Jinzhou and Qinhuangdao, effectively isolating Jinzhou.

Chiang Kai-shek arrived in Beiping on 30 September and held a military conference with Fu Zuoyi.  The Nationalists assembled the 39th, 62nd and 92nd Army led by Hou Jingru to reinforce Jinzhou as part of the "East-Advancing Army Corps", with the objective to fortify Nationalist positions in Huludao.  On 2 October, Chiang flew to Shenyang to discuss the formation of the "West-Advancing Army Corps" with Wei Lihuang, and ordered Liao Yaoxiang to reinforce Jinzhou with the 9th Army from the west to break the encirclement attempt of Jinzhou by the CCP.  With the new developments in Nationalist strategies, Lin Biao was initially hesitant to continue with Communist offensive against Jinzhou, but he was convinced to carry on with the assault by Mao Zedong.

By 8 October, the Northeast Field Army have amassed 250,000 troops and completed the encirclement of Jinzhou.  Between 10 and 15 October, the Nationalist reinforcements for Jinzhou from both the west and the east were closing in on the Communists, but they were decisively stopped in Tashan.  The final assault on Jinzhou began on 14 October.  The city was captured in the next evening, along with the Nationalist commander Fan Hanjie and 80,000 Nationalist troops.

Changchun 

Changchun had been encircled for more than five months prior to the campaign.  Already weakened by starvation since February 1948, civilians were fleeing Changchun in large numbers on daily basis by June 1948.  Many refugees were unable to pass through the Communist blockade, and unable to return as the Nationalist defenders blocks refugees from returning to the city.  The Nationalist garrison were unable to break out of the city despite the order from Chiang.  Following the fall of Jinzhou, the Nationalist 60th Army stationed in the east side of the city defected to the Communist side on 17 October.  Following their defection, the Nationalist New 7th Army agreed to the terms of surrender on 19 October.  The remaining Nationalist forces in Changchun surrendered the city to the PLA on 23 October, and Nationalist commander Zheng Dongguo became a prisoner of war.

Nationalist counter-offensive (21–28 October)

Heishan 

After the Nationalist forces suffered heavy losses in Jinzhou and Changchun, Chiang Kai-shek intended to stage a counteroffensive and quickly recapture Jinzhou. He ordered Liao Yaoxiang and the Ninth Army Group which had been advancing from Shenyang to continue marching west and attack Jinzhou. However, Liao and other senior Nationalist officers contested this decision. On 16 October, the Nationalist high command reached a consensus and decided to attack Heishan and Dahushan instead, covering their withdrawal to Yingkou in the process. The decision was approved by Chiang, and on 21 October the Ninth Army Group launched an attack on Heishan.

The Communist forces successfully defended Heishan and Dahushan, and the Nationalist forces were unable to make any progress. The Ninth Army Group was subsequently encircled by the main forces of the PLA and decisively defeated. Over 25,000 Nationalist soldiers had been killed in action, and Liao Yaoxiang was captured by the PLA.

Fall of Shenyang (29 October – 2 November) 

After the Ninth Army Group was destroyed, the Northeast Field Army began to encircle Shenyang on 29 October. As the city fell into disarray, the Nationalist's Eighth Army Group collapsed as the commander Wei Lihuang fled from Shenyang by plane on 30 October. The Communist forces launched the final assault on Shenyang the next morning on 1 November against the Nationalist garrison of 140,000 men, which quickly surrendered soon after. On 2 November, Yingkou was also captured by the Communist forces, with the Nationalist 52nd Army narrowly retreating by ship. The remainder of the Nationalist forces, mostly from the West Army, managed to preserve some of their strength as they withdrew from Huludao to Tianjin. With the Northeast being completely clear of the Nationalist forces, the Liaoshen campaign effectively came to its conclusion.

Aftermath 

According to Lew, the Liaoshen campaign was both a major "strategic and tactical defeat" for Chiang Kai-shek and the Nationalist government, as the initial objective of containing the Communists in the Northeast failed after the fall of Jinzhou. Between 1945 and 1948, Chiang committed some of his best troops from the Chinese Expeditionary Force in the Northeast against the CCP, and many of these troops were lost in the subsequent campaigns. The role of Mao Zedong in pushing Lin Biao to fully commit in the final attack of Jinzhou elevated the reputation of Mao in the CCP. With the CCP fully in control of the Northeast, Nationalist garrisons in Beiping and Tianjin led by Fu Zuoyi were now exposed to Communist attacks.

References

Citations

Sources 

 
 
 
 
 

Conflicts in 1948
L
Military history of Manchuria
1948 in China